Utetheisa guttulosa is a moth in the family Erebidae. It was described by Francis Walker in 1864. It is found on Sulawesi.

References

Moths described in 1864
guttulosa